Canariella planaria is a species of small air-breathing land snail, a terrestrial pulmonate gastropod mollusk in the family Canariellidae, the hairy snails and their allies. This species is endemic to the north-eastern coastal area of the island of Tenerife, in the Canary Islands.

References

 Groh, K. & Neubert, E. 2011.  Canariella planaria.   2013. IUCN Red List of Threatened Species. Downloaded on 7 April 2014.

Endemic fauna of the Canary Islands
Canariella
Articles containing video clips
Gastropods described in 1822